Meghpur is a village in Kutch, state of Gujarat in western India.

External links
 Official site of the Meghpur Community
 Shree Kutch Leval Patel Community SKLPC

See also
 Meghpur (village), a village in Uttar Pradesh, India
 Samatra
 Bharasar
 Kodki

Villages in Kutch district